The  is a dam on the Sasama River, a tributary of the Ōi River, located on the border of the city of Shimada and the town of Kawanehon, Shizuoka Prefecture on the island of Honshū, Japan.

History
The potential of the Ōi River valley for hydroelectric power development was realized by the Meiji government at the start of the 20th century. The Ōi River was characterized by a high volume of flow and a fast current. Its mountainous upper reaches and tributaries were areas of steep valleys and abundant rainfall, and were sparsely populated. The British interests were bought out by 1921, and the company was renamed . By the mid-1950s, numerous dams had been constructed on the main flow of the Ōi River, and developers began to turn their attention to its various tributary streams.

The Sasamagawa Dam and neighboring Shiogo Dam were constructed to provide water for the 58,000 KW Kawaguchi Hydroelectric Plant built by the Shimada city government. Construction work began in 1955 and was completed by 1960 by the Hazama Corporation. The dam serves a secondary purpose in providing water for irrigation to farms in the surrounding area.

Design
The Sasagawa Dam was designed as a solid core concrete gravity dam with a central spillway.

References
Japan Commission on Large Dams. Dams in Japan: Past, Present and Future. CRC Press (2009). 
photo page with data

Gravity dams
Dams in Shizuoka Prefecture
Hydroelectric power stations in Japan
Dams completed in 1960